The Fort St. John Group is a stratigraphic unit of Lower Cretaceous age in the Western Canada Sedimentary Basin. It takes the name from the city of Fort St. John, British Columbia and was first defined by George Mercer Dawson in 1881.

Lithology
The Fort St. John Group is mostly composed of dark shale deposited in a marine environment. Bentonite is present in the shale, and it is interbedded with sandstone, siltstone and conglomerates.

Distribution
The Fort St. John Group occurs in the subsurface in the Peace River Country of northeastern British Columbia and north-western Alberta, in southern Yukon and southern Northwest Territories.

Relationship to other units
The Fort St. John Group is conformably overlain by the Dunvegan Formation and conformably underlain by the Bullhead Group or may rest disconformably on older units.

Subdivisions
The Fort St. John Group is subdivided into the following formations:

Canadian Rockies foothills of British Columbia

Peace River Country

Liard River and Fort Liard Area

*Buckinghorse Formation is equivalent to the sum of Lepine Formation, Scatter Formation and Garbutt Formation. It occurs north-east of the Canadian Rockies foothills in British Columbia, between the Halfway River and Muskwa River. It is composed of silty marine mudstone with fine grained marine sandstone interbeds.

References

Lower Cretaceous Series of North America
Cretaceous Alberta
Cretaceous British Columbia
Cretaceous Northwest Territories
Cretaceous Yukon
Stratigraphy of Alberta
Stratigraphy of British Columbia
Stratigraphy of the Northwest Territories
Stratigraphy of Yukon